Roy Taylor may refer to:

Roy Taylor (cricketer) (born 1944), South African cricketer
Roy Taylor (cyclist) (1916–1987), New Zealand cyclist
Roy Taylor (ecologist) (1924–2007), British ecologist
Roy Taylor (footballer) (1891–1969), Australian footballer
Bert Taylor (footballer, born 1900) (1900–1980), known as Roy Taylor, Australian rules footballer
Roy Taylor (historian), winner of the Julian Corbett Prize in Naval History 1954
Roy Taylor (scientist), physician and diabetologist at Newcastle University, United Kingdom
Roy Taylor (tennis) (1883–1934), Australian tennis and lacrosse player
Roy A. Taylor (1910–1995), American politician
Roy Charles Taylor (1889–1963), Canadian politician, elected in Alberta general election, 1935
J. Roy Taylor (born 1949), professor of physics at Imperial College London